The 1988–89 European Cup was the 24th edition of the European Cup, IIHF's premier European club ice hockey tournament. The season started on October 2, 1988, and finished on February 19, 1989.

The tournament was won by CSKA Moscow, who won the final group.

Preliminary round

Group round

Group A
(Esbjerg, Denmark)

Group A standings

Group B
(Nijmegen, Netherlands)

Group B standings

Group C
(Klagenfurt, Carinthia, Austria)

Group C standings

Group D
(Lugano, Ticino, Switzerland)

Group D standings

Final Group
(Cologne, North Rhine-Westphalia, West Germany)

Final group standings

References
 Season 1989

1988–89 in European ice hockey
IIHF European Cup